H.M. Naqvi (born 1973) is a Pakistani novelist (currently based in Karachi) who is the author of Home Boy, winner of the inaugural DSC Prize for South Asian Literature.

Life
H.M. Naqvi was born in London in 1973 and grew up in Karachi, Pakistan. After graduating from Georgetown University (1996) with degrees in economics and English literature, he wrote short stories while subsisting on a "two-dollar budget". He also ran the only slam poetry venue in Washington D.C., the Fifteen Minutes Club. He represented Pakistan in the National Poetry Slam in Ann Arbor, Michigan in 1995. His poems were broadcast on NPR and BBC.

In 1997 he joined the World Bank and spent the next eight years working in the financial services industry on the East Coast and in Karachi. When he quit in 2003, he left for Cambridge, Massachusetts where sat in classes at Harvard's English department, pretending to be a student, including James Wood's survey of postwar fiction and Elvis Mitchell's class on contemporary film.

Subsequently, he attended the creative writing program at Boston University where he worked with National Book Award recipient Ha Jin. While working on his novel, he taught writing at Boston University. He wrote till six in the morning and taught in the afternoons and evenings.

Naqvi moved to Karachi in 2007. He has since worked in his hometown on reportage and his next novel. In 2010, he was a resident participant in the International Writing Program at the University of Iowa.

Naqvi has written on contemporary Pakistani art, minorities, and Balochistan for the Global Post and on Karachi for Forbes.

Home Boy
H. M. Naqvi's debut novel Home Boy was first published in the United States in September 2009 by the Crown Books division of Random House to acclaim. The New York Times hailed it as "smart…debut [that] is at once immigrant narrative, bildungsroman and New York City novel, with a dash of the picaresque…Naqvi is a former slam poet, and his exuberant sentences burst with the rhythms and driving power of that form while steering clear of bombast. "Home Boy" is a remarkably engaging novel that delights as it disturbs.". On his American tour, he returned to slam roots for a performance at the Nuyorican Poets Club. He also read at Harvard University, the Tenement Museum, the Brooklyn Book Festival and the Asia Society.

When Home Boy was published in India in January 2010 by HarperCollins, it hit the top ten fiction best-seller list. According to the Indian Express, the novel is "culturally au courant and with an eye for the absurd – a cross between early Jay McInerney and Gary Shteyngart, with subcontinental seasoning. It incorporates underground music, fashion and intoxication-producing substances as well as...Faiz Ahmed Faiz and home-cooked seekh kebab and biryani." In January 2010 he attended the Jaipur Literature Festival.

Home Boy has been very well received in Naqvi's native Pakistan. He has read The Second Floor [T2F], Khas Gallery, Shaheed Zulfiqar Ali Bhutto Institute of Science and Technology [SZABIST] and at the Indus Valley School of Arts. He was also in discussion with London-based Pakistani artist Faiza Butt at Art Dubai. The German, Italian and Portuguese editions of the book were published in 2010.

Works 
Home boy : a novel New York : Shaye Areheart Books, 2009. , 
The selected works of Abdullah the Cossack : a novel, New York, NY : Black Cat, 2019. ,

Awards
Ora Mary Phelam Poetry Prize
 DSC Prize for South Asian Literature for Home Boy – Winner (2011)

References

External links
 Author website

Pakistani novelists
1973 births
Georgetown University alumni
Boston University College of Arts and Sciences alumni
Slam poets
Muhajir people
Living people
People from Islamabad
Writers from Karachi
English-language writers from Pakistan